Sansón (born 1994) is a Mexican luchador enmascarado, or masked professional wrestler, where he is currently signed to Lucha Libre AAA Worldwide. Is best known for his work for Consejo Mundial de Lucha Libre (CMLL). While his real name has not been revealed, in keeping with lucha libre traditions, his paternal last name is known as he is the son of Carmelo Reyes González, better known under the ring name Cien Caras. He is the nephew of professional wrestlers Máscara Año 2000 and Universo 2000. Sansón regularly teams up with his brother El Cuatrero and cousin Forastero as a trio known as Nueva Generación Dinamita ("New Generation Dynamites"),  after his father and uncles' group Los Hermanos Dinamita. His ring name is Spanish for Samson, which is reflected in the stylized lion's head logo used on his mask and tights.

At one point Sansón held three different CMLL championships because he had won the Occidente Trios Championship and the Mexican National Trios Championship with the other members of Nueva Generación Diniamitas and the CMLL Arena Coliseo Tag Team Championship with his brother. While he is the son of Cien Caras he is not related to the wrestlers who used the names Cien Caras Jr. and El Hijo de Cien Caras.

Personal life
Sansón was born in 1994 in Lagos de Moreno in the central Mexican state of Jalisco, son of professional wrestler Carmelo Reyes González, better known under the ring name Cien Caras ("100 Faces"). Since Sansón works as a masked professional wrestler his real name is not a matter of public record, a tradition in Mexican Lucha libre where masked wrestlers' private lives are concealed from the wrestling fanbase. His younger brother, known under the ring name El Cuatrero, was born two years later in 1996. His uncles Jesús (known as Máscara Año 2000) and Andrés (Universo 2000) were also professional wrestlers. Several second-generation Reyes family  would later become wrestlers as well, including Forastero, Universo 2000 Jr. and Máscara Año 2000 Jr. At first Carlemo Reyes did not want his sons to follow in his footsteps, hoping they would get a good education and steady jobs. He eventually agreed that his sons could practice Lucha Libre with their uncle Andrés, but only as a hobby. During their training, Carmelo noticed how serious they took up their hobby and finally gave them his blessing to become professional wrestlers.

In Mexican wrestling, there is a long history of wrestlers paying for the rights to use a ring name and be portrayed as a second or third-generation wrestler without actually being related, which can lead to some confusion around who are legitimately second or third-generation wrestlers. It has been confirmed that wrestlers Cien Caras Jr. and El Hijo de Cien Caras are not related to the Reyes family, while it is unclear if Hijo de Máscara Año 2000 is a blood relative or a fictional relative. Reyes later stated that he allowed the "Cien Caras" name to be rented by other wrestlers as his sons were very young and at the time and unsure they would become professional wrestlers.

Professional wrestling career

Both Sansón and El Cuatrero made their in-ring debut around the year 2010 and worked locally in Lagos de Moreno while continuing their education. He chose the ring name Sansón to honor his father, as Carmelo Reyes had originally worked under that ring name himself when he made his debut in 1974. During their time working locally in Lagos de Moreno the duo won their first Lucha de Apuestas, or bet match, where they defeated Los Centellas (I and II) and unmasked them.

Consejo Mundial de Lucha Libre (2014–2021)
In early 2014, the Reyes brothers started working in Guadalajara for the local Consejo Mundial de Lucha Libre (CMLL) promoters at Arena Coliseo, as well as training at the CMLL wrestling school under trainers Último Guerrero, Virus and Franco Colombo. They made their CMLL debut on March 25, 2014, teaming with their uncle Universo 2000 in a loss to the trio of Blue Panther, Sagrado and Valiente. While working in Guadalajara Cuatrero and Sansón competed in a tournament to determine the number one contenders for the local Occidente Tag Team Championship, but the two were eliminated by the team of Flash and Flash II. The brothers teamed up with Jocker for a trios tournament, with the winners being crowned the new Occidente Trios Champions. The team made it all the way to the final match of the tournament but were defeated b Furia Roja, Mr. Trueno and Ray Trueno. On November 11, 2015, Cuatrero and Sansón teamed up with their cousin Forastero to win the Occidente Trios Championship.

Sansón's first match at Arena México, CMLL's main venue, took place on January 12, 2016, where he, and his brother, completed in the 2016 version of the La Copa Junior tournament. During the match, he eliminated Soberano Jr. before being eliminated by Esfinge later in the match. At that point the Reyes brothers began being referred to as Nueva Generación Dinamita (Spanish for "New Generation Dynamites") as a reference to their heritage. On March 18, 2016 Nueva Generación Dinamita worked their first major show for CMLL, defeating Soberano Jr. and Oro Jr. in the opening match of that year's Homenaje A Dos Leyendas show. CMLL decided to have both El Cuatrero and Sansón participate in their annual Torneo Gran Alternativa ("Great Alternativa Tournament") where younger wrestlers team up with established veteran wrestlers for a tag team tournament. Sansón was paired with El Terrible for the tournament, but the duo lost to Pegasso and Máscara Dorada in the first round of the tournament.

In April 2017 Sansón participated in his second La Copa Junior tournament. After working in Mexico City for more a year, gaining in-ring experience, CMLL decided to push Sansón by having him win his qualifying block by lastly eliminating Blue Panther Jr. The following week Sansón lost to Sobreano Jr., the only wrestler he eliminated the previous year. CMLL kept pairing Sansón and Sobreano Jr. opposite each other as they both progressed to the finals of the 2017 Gran Alternativa. On June 16 Soberano Jr. and Carístico defeated Sansón and Último Guerrero to win the tournament.

July 2017 proved a turning point in how CMLL booked Nueva Generación Dinamita as Sansón and El Cuatrero defeated Black Terry and Negro Navarro to win the CMLL Arena Coliseo Tag Team Championship, CMLL's second highest ranked tag team championship. Three days later the trio defeated Los Hijos del Infierno (Ephesto, Luciferno and Mephisto) to win the Mexican National Trios Championship, making Ephesto a triple championship. During the 2017 Leyenda de Plata tournament Sansón gained a measure of revenge against rival Soberano Jr. eliminating him from the tournament before being eliminated himself. During CMLL's 2017 Dia de Los Muertos celebrations Sansón outlasted seven other wrestlers: El Cuatrero, Diamante Azul, Forastero, Hechicero, Valiente. Carístico and rival Sobreano Jr., to win the Rey del Inframundo ("King of the Underworld") tournament. 
The NGD trio would go on to win CMLL's La Copa Dinastia, defeating the trios of Blue Panther, Blue Panther Jr., The Panter and then Dragon Lee, Místico II and Pierroth. On February 14, 2018 Nueva Generación Dinamita announced that they were relinquishing the CMLL Arena Coliseo Tag Team Championship, with the storyline given that they were focusing on winning the CMLL World Tag Team Championship. Subsequently, Sansón and Forastero entered the tournament for the vacant championship, but lost to Dragon Lee and Místico in the first round. At the CMLL 85th Anniversary Show, the Dinamitas defeated Atlantis, El Soberano Jr., and Mistico as part of CMLL's most important show of the year.

All three members of Nueva Generación Dinamita participated in the 2019 Fantastica Mania tour of Japan for the first time, capping off the tour with a successful championship defense against Ángel de Oro, Atlantis, and Titán on its last day. As holder of the CMLL World Middleweight Championship, 2019 also marked the first year that El Cuatrero participated in the Universal Championship, a tournament where all 16 participants held a championship recognized by CMLL. Sansón lost to Volador Jr. in the opening round. For the 2019 Torneo Nacional de Parejas Increíbles ("National Incredible Teams Tournament"), Sansón was paired up with long-time rival Soberano Jr. as a rudo (The "bad guy") and a tecnico (the "Good guy") team up for the event. The odd couple defeated Tritón and Rey Bucanero in the first round before losing to the eventual tournament winners Titán and Bárbaro Cavernario. As part of the 66th anniversary of Arena Puebla, NGD successfully defended the Mexican National Trios Championship against Los Ingobernables (El Terrible, La Bestia del Ring, and Rush), in what was their tenth overall championship defense.

The 2020 Sin Piedad show offered Sansón the opportunity to become a three-time champion as he and Cuatrero challenged Místico and Carístico for the CMLL World Tag Team Championship but lost the match. During the 2020 Fantastica Mania tour, Sansón and his brother participated in the family tag team tournament, where they ended up defeating Los Hermanos Chavez (Ángel de Oro and Niebla Roja) in the finals. On the final day of the tour, January 20, NGD successfully defended the Mexican National Trios Championship against Los Hermanos Chavez and Titán. On February 24, 2020, El Cuatrero and Sansón won the Torneo de parejas familiares ("Family Team Tournament") as they defeated the uncle/nephew team of Rey Bucanero and Drone in the first round, the father/son team of Euforia and Soberano Jr. in the second round, and finally the Gran Guerrero/Último Guerrero brothers in the finals. On March 26, 2021, they defeated Los Guerreros Laguneros to win the CMLL World Trios Championship. On August 10, 2021, CMLL announced the departure of Nueva Generación Dinamita.

Independent circuit (2014–current)
While working for CMLL, Sansón, like all their contracted wrestlers, is allowed to take independent circuit bookings on days he is not needed by CMLL not arranged through CMLL. On February 19, 2017, Sansón and El Cuatrero unsuccessfully challenged Black Terry and Negro Navarro for the CMLL Arena Coliseo Tag Team Championship on a Lucha Memes show in Puebla. NGD also successfully defended the Mexican National Trios Championship against Los Kamikazes del Aire (Alas de Acero, Aramis, and Iron Kid) at a subsequent Lucha Memes show.

As part of CMLL's collaboration with The Crash Lucha Libre, Nueva Generación Dinamita has performed on several The Crash shows over the years. In their initial appearance for The Crash, Nueva Generación Dinamita lost to La Rebelión Amarilla (Bestia 666, Jacob Fatu and Mecha Wolf 450). The team returned to The Crash for their VII Anniversary Show show, where they lost to Los Lucha Bros (Penta El 0M and The King) in a match for The Crash Tag Team Championship that also included Reno Scum (Adam Thornstowe and Luster the Legend). They returned to The Crash in December 2018, losing to Bestia 666 and Garza Jr. in the main event. In 2019, Sansón and Cuatrero worked an extended storyline against Los Traumas (Trauma I and Trauma II) in The Crash. In June Sansón was forced to team up with Trauma I to face Cuatrero and Trauma II in a relevos increíbles ("incredible pairs" match), where the regular partners refused to wrestle against each other. In the end, Sansón and Trauma I won after Trauma II hit El Cuatrero during the match. This was followed by a tag team match where NGD defeated Los Traumas by disqualification as part of their ongoing storyline.

On June 16, 2019, Sansón, Cuatrero, and Forastero Sansón appeared at the International Wrestling Revolution Group's annual Festival de las Máscaras show. The trio defeated their cousin Máscara Año 2000 Jr., teaming with Capo del Sur and Capo del Norte, who both use ring characters inspired by the original Los Dinamitas.

Championships and accomplishments
Consejo Mundial de Lucha Libre
CMLL World Trios Championship (1 time) - with El Cuatrero and Forastero
CMLL Arena Coliseo Tag Team Championship (1 time) – with El Cuatrero
Mexican National Trios Championship (1 time) – with El Cuatrero and Forastero
Occidente Trios Championship (1 time) – with El Cuatrero and Forastero
La Copa Dinastia (2017) – with Sansón and Forastero
Torneo de parejas familiares (2020) – with El Cuatrero
El Rey del Inframundo (2017)

Lucha Libre AAA Worldwide
AAA World Trios Championship (1 time) with El Cuatrero and Forastero

Pro Wrestling Illustrated
Ranked No. 200 of the top 500 singles wrestlers in the PWI 500 in 2021

Luchas de Apuestas record

References

1994 births
Date of birth missing (living people)
Living people
Mexican male professional wrestlers
Masked wrestlers
Professional wrestlers from Jalisco
People from Lagos de Moreno, Jalisco
Unidentified wrestlers
AAA World Trios Champions
Mexican National Trios Champions
21st-century professional wrestlers
CMLL World Trios Champions